Achmad Rifa'i (1786–1870) was an Islamic thinker and writer known for his anti-Dutch stance. He was registered as a National Hero of Indonesia in 2004.

References

National Heroes of Indonesia
Indonesian Muslims
1786 births
1870 deaths
19th-century Indonesian people
18th-century Indonesian people